Kaynak Yayınları (English: Resource Publications) is an independent publishing company based in Istanbul, Turkey.

It was founded in 1982. It has published authors such as Halil Berktay, Doğu Perinçek and Oktay Yıldırım. It has been banned in various state libraries since coup d'état attempt in Turkey.

References

External links
 Kaynak Yayınları web site

Book publishing companies of Turkey
Companies established in 1982
1982 establishments in Turkey